A Launched Loop is a type of steel launched shuttle roller coaster manufactured by Arrow Dynamics. With 8 different installations, 7 of them being relocated at least once, the ride was introduced in 1977, with the last one opening in 1993.

History 
The first installation of a Launched Loop dates back to 1977 with the installation of Demon at Kings Island in Mason, Ohio. Two more also opened in 1977; Zoomerang at Boardwalk and Baseball in Haines City, Florida, and Black Widow at Six Flags New England in Agawam, Massachusetts. These were most likely built to rival Intamin's Shuttle Loop, which started being built the same year. In 1987, Demon at Kings Island became the first Launched Loop to be relocated, becoming Thunderbolt Express at Camden Park in Huntington, West Virginia. , only three Launched Loops operate: Revolution at Blackpool Pleasure Beach in Lancashire, England, Sidewinder at Elitch Gardens in Denver, Colorado, and Diamond Back at Frontier City in Oklahoma City, Oklahoma.

Notable installations 
 Lightnin' Loops was a combination of two different launched loop roller coasters with interlocking loops built for Six Flags Great Adventure in 1978. One track closed in 1987 and stood nonoperational until 1992 when the other track closed. The track that closed in 1987 was then relocated to Frontier City as Diamond Back as the other track was relocated to Six Flags America as Python, both opening in 1993.
 Demon at Kings Island, while not being the first built, was the first launched loop to open. The ride was then relocated to Camden Park as Thunderbolt Express where it operated until 1999.
 Revolution at Blackpool Pleasure Beach is the longest-operating launched loop, opening in 1979, and also is the only of its kind to not be relocated any time in its lifetime.

Installations

References